The Morgan Plus 4 Plus or +4+ was an attempt by the Morgan Motor Company to modernize the bodywork. Announced at the 1963 Earls Court Motor Show, only 26 were built, due to poor sales, in spite of its performance.

The equipment may have varied, but an example sold in 1969 was mechanically similar to the Morgan +4 of the same year. It had the straight 4 pushrod engine of a Triumph TR4A, giving . The transmission was 4 speed with synchromesh on 2nd, 3rd and 4th. It also shared the suspension with the +4. In front, it had sliding king pins tilted 17 degrees from the vertical, a development of a 1910 design. This was lubricated by grease and by engine oil released by a button under the clutch pedal. It had coil springs (very hard) and bottoming coils instead of rubber pads. The rear had conventional leaf springs with solid rear axle. There was no perceptible body lean, even when cornering very hard. It had disc brakes in front, drums in the rear, hard pedal pressure with no power assist. The frame was Z section steel rails with structural plywood floor, extended by steel tubes in front.

Performance was better than +4, because the fibreglass kept the weight low in spite of more interior space, and the more modern shape had less air drag. Sound insulation was limited, but leg room was unusually generous.

References

External links 
GoMoG Workshop Manual

4
Cars introduced in 1963